Cianjur Regency is a regency (kabupaten) of West Java, Indonesia. The area of the regency is 3,614.35 km2 and its population at the 2010 Census was 2,171,281; the 2020 Census produced a total of 2,477,560 and the official estimate as at mid 2021 was 2,506,682. The town of Cianjur is its capital.  Northern parts of the regency form a valley (above the 'neck'), and are far more densely populated than southern regions.  As such, a portion of the northern valley (consisting of Cugenang, Pacet, Sukaresmi and Cipanas districts in the far northwest of the regency) was briefly included in a definition of Greater Jakarta called Jabodetabekjur (jur for Cianjur).

Administrative divisions
Cianjur Regency is divided into thirty-two districts (kecamatan), listed below with their areas and their populations at the 2010 and 2020 Censuses, together with the official estimates as at mid 2021. The table also includes the location of the district administrative centres, the number of villages (rural desa and urban kelurahan) in each district, and its post code.

(A) Districts south of the "neck"

(B) Districts north of the "neck"

Note that 4 districts (indicated by "*" in the table above) for a while formed part of the defined metropolitan district of Jabodetabekjur.Of the 360 villages, 354 are rural desa, while 6 are urban kelurahan, which are all part of Cianjur District (kecamatan).

Tourism

Mount Padang
A terracing structure, although local people mention it as a pyramid, lies on Mount Padang, 31 kilometer from Cianjur through Warung Kondang. It is the biggest Megalithic Site in Southeast Asia.

References